Baptiste Dedola (born 15 May 2001) is a French professional footballer who most recently played as a forward for AC Ajaccio in the French Ligue 2.

Career
Dedola made his professional debut with AC Ajaccio in a 1–0 loss to LB Châteauroux on 22 August 2020.

Personal life
Dedola was born in France to an Italian father and Ivorian mother.

References

External links
 

2001 births
Living people
People from Sainte-Foy-lès-Lyon
French footballers
French people of Italian descent
French sportspeople of Ivorian descent
Association football forwards
AC Ajaccio players
Ligue 2 players
Championnat National 3 players
Sportspeople from Lyon Metropolis
Footballers from Auvergne-Rhône-Alpes